Space Between may refer to:

 Space Between (album), a 2019 album from Sammy Hagar's band The Circle
 "Space Between", a song from Sia's 2016 album This Is Acting
 "The Space Between", a song from Dave Matthews Band's 2001 album Everyday
 The Space Between (disambiguation)